In the 21st century, the earth's climate and its energy policy interact and their relationship is studied and governed by a variety of national and international institutions.

The relationships between energy-resource depletion, climate change, health resources and the environment, and the effects that they have on each other, have been subject to numerous scientific studies and research efforts. As a result, a majority of governments  see climate and energy as two of the most important policy goals of the twenty first century. 

The correlation between climate and energy rests on known causal relationships between human population growth, rising energy consumption and land use and the resulting greenhouse gas emissions and climate change.

The concern for climate change control and mitigation has consequently spurred policy makers and scientists to treat energy use and global climate as an inextricable nexus with effects also going in reverse direction and create various initiatives, institutions and think tanks for a high-level treatment of the relationships:

Major Economies Forum on Energy and Climate Change (global)
Americas Energy and Climate Symposium (Americas)
Ministry of Climate, Energy and Building (Denmark)
Business for Innovative Climate and Energy Policy (US)
United States House Select Committee on Energy Independence and Global Warming (US)
European Union climate and energy package (EU)
Department of Energy and Climate Change (UK)
White House Office of Energy and Climate Change Policy (US)
Department of Climate Change and Energy Efficiency (Australia)
Minister for the Environment and Energy (Australia)
Climate Change and Sustainable Energy Act 2006
Wuppertal Institute for Climate, Environment and Energy (Germany)
Center for Climate and Energy Solutions (UK)
City of Oakland Energy and Climate Action Plan (US)
Energy and Climate Change Select Committee (UK)
San Diego Journal of Climate and Energy Law (US)
Renewable Energy Sources and Climate Change Mitigation (United Nations)

See also
Water-energy nexus
Water, energy and food security nexus
Urbanization

References

Climate change and society
Energy consumption
Climatological research organizations
Energy development